Manuel Rodríguez may refer to:

Sports
 Manolete (Manuel Rodríguez Sánchez, 1917–1947), Spanish bullfighter
 Manuel Rodríguez Barros (1926-1997), Spanish cyclist
 Manuel Rodríguez (footballer) (1938–2018), Chilean footballer
 Manuel Rodríguez Navarro (born 1969), Spanish wheelchair basketball player
 Manuel Cristian Rodríguez (boxer) (born 1973), Argentine boxer
 Manuel Rodríguez (first baseman) (born 1985), Panamanian baseball player
 Manu Rodríguez (born 1991), Spanish basketball player
 Manuel Rodríguez (pitcher) (born 1996), Mexican baseball player
 Manuel Rodríguez (tennis), Chilean tennis player

Others
 Manuel Rodríguez Erdoíza (1785–1818), Chilean lawyer and guerrilla leader
 Manuel Rodríguez Lozano (1896–1971), Mexican painter
 Manuel Rodríguez Orellana (born 1948), Puerto Rican legal scholar, lawyer, lecturer, columnist, published poet and political leader
 Manuel Rodríguez Ramos (born 1908), Puerto Rican writer, law professor and Secretary of Justice of Puerto Rico
 Manuel Rodríguez Torices (1788–1816), Neogranadine statesman, lawyer, journalist, and Precursor of the Independence of Colombia
 Manuel Rodríguez Gómez (1928–2006), American neurologist most noted for his work on tuberous sclerosis, a rare genetic disorder
 Manuel Rodríguez Cuadros (born 1949), Peruvian diplomat and presidential candidate

Other uses
 Manuel Rodríguez Patriotic Front, left-wing guerrilla movement in Chile
 Manuel Rodriguez Island, an island in the Patagonian Archipelago in Magallanes y la Antártica Chilena Region, Chile
 Manuel Rodríguez (TV series), a 2010 Chilean telenovela broadcast in Chilevisión, based on the Chilean guerrilla Manuel Rodríguez Erdoiza